Mario Alberto Hernández Lash (born January 24, 1979) is a retired Mexican football defender.

Hernández debuted with Atlante F.C. on September 29, 2002, during a 2–0 loss to CF Monterrey. From there, he became a common fixture in the Potros starting line-up, often deligng fans with his top-notch defending. But after winning the Apertura 2007 title with Atlante, he fell out of the coach's plans. Most recently, he has been playing with Atlante's filial team, Potros Chetumal as their captain.

Honors

Club
Atlante F.C.
  Apertura 2007

External links
 

1979 births
Living people
Footballers from Nuevo León
Liga MX players
Atlante F.C. footballers
Association football defenders
Sportspeople from Monterrey
Mexican footballers